Matthew Burston (born 25 November 1982) is an Australian professional basketball player who last played for the Cairns Taipans of the National Basketball League (NBL). He has also played in the State Basketball League for the Perry Lakes Hawks, and has spent time in the Qatari Basketball League and the Big V.

Career
Burston debuted in the NBL for the Perth Wildcats during the 2000–01 season, and played for them until 2006. In 2003, he won the NBL Most Improved Player Award.

In April 2006, Burston signed a one-year deal with the South Dragons. Burston spent much of the 2006–07 season injured, playing only a handful of games. He remained with the Dragons for two more seasons and was a member of the 2009 championship-winning team.

On 22 June 2009, Burston signed with the Adelaide 36ers for the 2009–10 NBL season.

In 2010, Burston moved back to Melbourne and signed with the Tigers where he spent three seasons. In 2013, while playing in Qatar for Al Rayyan, Burston and his team won the Emir Cup.

On 25 July 2013, Burston signed a one-year deal with the Cairns Taipans. On 30 May 2014, he re-signed with the Taipans on a two-year deal. On 5 August 2016, the Taipans parted ways with Burston after not offering him a new contract for the 2016–17 season.

References

External links
Matt Burston at taipans.com
Matt Burston at foxsportspulse.com

1982 births
Living people
Adelaide 36ers players
Australian men's basketball players
Cairns Taipans players
Centers (basketball)
Melbourne Tigers players
People educated at Christ Church Grammar School
Perth Wildcats players
Power forwards (basketball)
South Dragons players